Countess Louise Sophie of Hanau-Lichtenberg (11 April 1662 in Bischofsheim am Hohen Steg – 9 April 1751 in Ottweiler) was a daughter of Johann Reinhard II, Count of Hanau-Lichtenberg (1628–1666) and Countess Palatine Anna Magdalena of Birkenfeld-Bischweiler (1640–1693).

She married on 27 September 1697 to Frederick Louis, Count of Nassau-Ottweiler (13 November 1651 – 25 May 1728).  This was his second marriage; it remained childless.

Ancestors

References 
 Reinhard Suchier: Genealogie des Hanauer Grafenhauses, in: Festschrift des Hanauer Geschichtsvereins zu seiner fünfzigjährigen Jubelfeier am 27. August 1894, Hanau, 1894
 Ernst J. Zimmermann: Hanau Stadt und Land, 3rd ed., Hanau, 1919, reprinted 1978

House of Nassau
1662 births
1751 deaths
House of Hanau
17th-century German people
18th-century German people